Fourth-seeded Ken McGregor defeated Frank Sedgman 7–5, 12–10, 2–6, 6–2 in the final to win the men's singles tennis title at the 1952 Australian Championships.

Seeds
The seeded players are listed below. Ken McGregor is the champion; others show the round in which they were eliminated.

 Frank Sedgman (finalist)
 Dick Savitt (semifinals)
 Mervyn Rose (semifinals)
 Ken McGregor (champion)
 Ian Ayre (quarterfinals)
 Ken Rosewall (quarterfinals)
 Lew Hoad (third round)
 Don Candy (quarterfinals)

Draw

Key
 Q = Qualifier
 WC = Wild card
 LL = Lucky loser
 r = Retired

Finals

Earlier rounds

Section 1

Section 2

Section 3

Section 4

External links
 

Australian Championships – Men's singles
1952